Trnovo is a village in the municipality of Gostivar, North Macedonia.

Demographics
As of the 2021 census, Trnovo had 137 residents with the following ethnic composition:
Albanians 112
Persons for whom data are taken from administrative sources 21
Others 4

According to the 2002 census, the village had a total of 539 inhabitants. Ethnic groups in the village include:
Albanians 539

References

External links

Villages in Gostivar Municipality
Albanian communities in North Macedonia